Nicholas 'Nick' Paul Weekes (born 20 October 1981) is a former English cricketer.  Weekes is a right-handed batsman who bowls right-arm fast.  He was born at Crawley, Sussex.

Weekes represented the Sussex Cricket Board in a single List A match came against the Wales Minor Counties in the 2nd round of the 2002 Cheltenham & Gloucester Trophy which was held in 2001.  In his only List A match, he scored 5 runs and took a single catch in the field.  With the ball he took a single wicket with figures of 1/51.

References

External links
Nick Weekes at Cricinfo
Nick Weekes at CricketArchive

1981 births
Living people
Sportspeople from Crawley
English cricketers
Sussex Cricket Board cricketers